Henry Patrick Egan Jr. (born August 17, 1937) is an American former basketball coach.  He served as the head basketball coach at the United States Air Force Academy from 1971 to 1984 and the University of San Diego from 1984 to 1994, compiling a career college basketball record of 304–311.  Egan subsequently worked an assistant coach in the National Basketball Association (NBA) with the San Antonio Spurs from 1994 to 2002, the Golden State Warriors in 2002–03, and the Cleveland Cavaliers from 2005 to 2010.  Gregg Popovich was an assistant coach under Egan at Air Force, while Egan was an assistant coach under Popovich with the Spurs.

Head coaching record

References

1937 births
Living people
Air Force Falcons men's basketball coaches
American men's basketball coaches
American men's basketball players
Cleveland Cavaliers assistant coaches
Golden State Warriors assistant coaches
Navy Midshipmen men's basketball players
San Antonio Spurs assistant coaches
San Diego Toreros men's basketball coaches